Regent Releasing was a U.S. theatrical distribution company based in Los Angeles, California, under the umbrella of Regent Entertainment, which was owned by producers Paul Colichman (formerly of IRS Media) and Stephen P. Jarchow.

Focusing on narrow releases of independent films from around the world and from U.S. filmmakers, Regent's successes include such Academy Award-winning films as Departures, Best Foreign Language film from Japan; Gods and Monsters, starring Ian McKellen; Sordid Lives, starring Olivia Newton-John, Delta Burke, and Leslie Jordan; Franco Zeffirelli's Callas Forever, starring Fanny Ardant, Jeremy Irons and Joan Plowright; and The Hunting of the President, producer Harry Thomason's documentary based on the book about the right-wing conspiracy to destroy Bill Clinton. Regent also distributed film acquisitions from Here Films, their LGBT sister public company.

In 2009, Regent merged with PlanetOut and Here Networks to form Here Media. Regent Releasing was merged into Here Media later in 2009; Here Media then launched Here Films.

Regent Releasing titles (by release year) include:

2010
Dream Boy
Eichmann
The Magician
Manuela y Manuel
Murder in Fashion
Patrik, Age 1.5
Shake Hands with the Devil
Watercolors

2009
The Blue Tooth Virgin
Departures (Academy Award Best Foreign Language Film)
Eleven Minutes
Little Ashes
Serbis
Sex Positive
The Song of Sparrows
Taxidermia
Tokyo Sonata

2008
$9.99
The Amazing Truth about Queen Raquela
Antarctica
Breakfast with Scot
Ciao
Cthulhu
Holding Trevor
The Hottie and the Nottie
I Can't Think Straight
Kabluey
Kiss the Bride
No Regret
Saving Marriage
Shelter
Tru Loved
Vivere
The World Unseen

2007
Cut Sleeve Boys
Eleven Men Out
Fat Girls
Freshman Orientation
Looking for Cheyenne (Oublier Cheyenne)
Nina's Heavenly Delights
Race You to the Bottom
ShowBusiness: The Road to Broadway (documentary)
Stephanie Daley
Unconscious

2006
April's Shower
Aurora Borealis
In Her Line of Fire
Guys and Balls
The Mostly Unfabulous Social Life of Ethan Green
Poster Boy
Queens
Shock to the System
Summer Storm

2005
Beautiful Boxer
Eternal
Hellbent
Margaret Cho: Assassin
Sex, Politics & Cocktails

2004
The Burial Society
Callas Forever
The Hunting of the President (documentary)
Merci Docteur Rey
Showboy
Straight-Jacket

2003
Friends and Family

2001
Sordid Lives
Speedway Junky

2000
Looking for an Echo
$pent

1999
Sixth Happiness

References

External links
Regent Releasing official site
 Regent parent site
 Regent Media sister site

Film distributors of the United States
Entertainment companies based in California
Companies based in Los Angeles
Entertainment companies established in 1999
1999 establishments in California